Donja Dubrava can refer to:
 Donja Dubrava, Zagreb, a city district of Zagreb, Croatia
 Donja Dubrava, Međimurje County, a village in northern Croatia